Zhalekeh-ye Hoseyn (also Romanized as Zhālekeh-ye Ḩoseyn; also known as Zhālegeh) is a village in Ban Zardeh Rural District, in the Central District of Dalahu County, Kermanshah Province, Iran. At the 2006 census, its population was 179, in 41 families.

References 

Populated places in Dalahu County